George Richard Mappes (December 25, 1865 – February 20, 1934) was a baseball catcher and second baseman for the St. Louis Maroons and Baltimore Orioles.

External links

1865 births
1934 deaths
St. Louis Maroons players
Baltimore Orioles (AA) players
Terre Haute (minor league baseball) players
Atlanta Atlantas players
Milwaukee Brewers (minor league) players
Kansas City Cowboys (minor league) players
19th-century baseball players